Cape Riche Homestead also known as Moirs Property is a building situated at Cape Riche approximately  east of Albany in the Great Southern region of Western Australia.

George Cheyne took up land in the area in 1836. He moved to the area in 1842 to trade with whalers in the area. He also introduced the Moir family, relatives of his from Scotland, to the area, with his nephew Andrew Moir arriving in 1841. Moir acquired the property from his uncle in 1858.

The homestead and out-buildings were constructed between 1850 and 1850. A billiards room was built by John Moir with the assistance of Aboriginal people, with a blacksmith shop built at around the same time. Much of the furniture was fashioned from driftwood found on the nearby beaches.

See also
 List of places on the State Register of Heritage Places in the City of Albany

References

Great Southern (Western Australia)
Homesteads in Western Australia